was one of 18   escort destroyers built for the Imperial Japanese Navy (IJN) during World War II. Completed in September 1944, the ship began convoy escort duty on 25 October. She damaged an American submarine in December after it had sunk an aircraft carrier in one of her convoys. In January 1945, Hinoki was one of the escorts for a convoy to Manila, the Philippines. While trying to leave Manila Harbor several days later, her small convoy was discovered by the Americans and fruitlessly engaged by American and Australian ships detached from their own convoy. After the Allied ships had disengaged, the Japanese ships were attacked by American aircraft that sank one of Hinokis sister ships and damaged Hinoki. Two days later the destroyer attempted to leave Manila again, but she was discovered not long afterwards by American destroyers who sank her in a gun duel with the loss of all hands.

Design and description
Designed for ease of production, the Matsu class was smaller, slower and more lightly armed than previous destroyers as the IJN intended them for second-line duties like escorting convoys, releasing the larger ships for missions with the fleet. Their crew numbered 210 officers and enlisted men. The ships had two Kampon geared steam turbines, each driving one propeller shaft, using steam provided by two Kampon water-tube boilers.

The main armament of the Matsu-class ships consisted of three  Type 89 dual-purpose guns in one twin-gun mount aft and one single mount forward of the superstructure. The single mount was partially protected against spray by a gun shield. The accuracy of the Type 89 guns was severely reduced against aircraft because no high-angle gunnery director was fitted. The ships carried a total of twenty-five  Type 96 anti-aircraft guns in 4 triple and 13 single mounts. The Matsus were equipped with Type 13 early-warning and Type 22 surface-search radars. The ships were also armed with a single rotating quadruple mount amidships for  torpedoes. They could deliver their 36 depth charges via two stern rails and two throwers.

Construction and career
Authorized in the late 1942 Modified 5th Naval Armaments Supplement Program, Hinoki was laid down on 4 March 1944 at the Yokosuka Naval Arsenal and launched on 7 July. Upon her completion on 30 September, the ship was assigned to Destroyer Squadron 11 of the Combined Fleet for training. The ship was assigned to Destroyer Division 52 on 15 November and Commander Iwagami Juichi assumed command of the destroyer while serving as the division's commander. Five days later the division was transferred to Escort Squadron 31 of the 5th Fleet. She was part of the escort for the carrier  on a ferry mission to Manila, the Philippines when the carrier was torpedoed and sunk by the American submarine  on 19 December. Hinoki damaged the submarine with depth charges and was briefly diverted to Takao, Taiwan, before proceeding to Manila on 22–24 December. The day after her arrival, the ship steamed for Cape St. Jacques in the Japanese-occupied French Indochina. On 31 December Hinoki and her sister  helped to escort the ex-Italian reefer ship Ikutagawa Maru from Cape St. Jacques to Manila, arriving on 4 January 1945.

The following day the trio attempted to leave Manila for Indochina despite the presence of a nearby Allied convoy headed towards Lingayen Gulf. Their departure was spotted by American aircraft and the three ships comprising the convoy's escort attempted to intercept them. The destroyer  led the two Australian ships, the frigate  and the sloop  towards the Japanese ships. Not long afterwards, the Allied ships were spotted in their turn by the Japanese who promptly reversed course back towards Manila. Bennion replied a minute later and Gascoyne opened fire at 16:03, but it fell about a nautical mile short of the Japanese ships. The American ship increased her speed at 16:11 in an attempt to close the range and opened fire again at 16:24 at  distance. He broke off the engagement at 16:40 upon receiving notice that a large number of Japanese aircraft were inbound and having expended 349 rounds of ammunition with no effect; the Japanese return fire was equally ineffective. The report was incorrect, but the nearby escort carriers of Task Group 77.4.1 had launched 16 torpedo bombers, escorted by 19 fighters. Their attack sank Momi and they moderately damaged Hinoki with a torpedo hit, killing 21 and wounding 45 crewmen.

After emergency repairs were completed on 7 January, the ship attempted to depart Manila again, this time several hours after dark. The Japanese ship immediately turned away to bring her torpedoes to bear and missed with all of them as the Americans had been making evasive turns throughout the pursuit in case of lurking submarines. Hinoki was hit by multiple shells at 22:35 and immediately slowed. Her return fire had frequently near-missed the American ship and her captain considered his ship lucky not have been hit. The IJN struck Hinoki from the navy list on 10 April.

Notes

Bibliography

 
 

 
 

Matsu-class destroyers
Ships built by Yokosuka Naval Arsenal
World War II destroyers of Japan
1944 ships
Maritime incidents in January 1945
Ships lost with all hands